George Evan Howell (September 21, 1905 – January 18, 1980) was a United States representative from Illinois and judge of the United States Court of Claims.

Education and career

Born in Marion, Illinois, Howell attended the public schools at Villa Grove, Illinois. He graduated with a Bachelor of Science degree from the University of Illinois College of Commerce and Business Administration at the University of Illinois at Urbana–Champaign in 1927 and from the University of Illinois College of Law with a Bachelor of Laws in 1930. He taught school at Harvard High School in McHenry County, Illinois, in 1927 and 1928. He served as member of the faculty of the College of Commerce at the University of Illinois at Urbana–Champaign from 1928 to 1930 while working his way through law school. He was admitted to the bar in 1930 and commenced practice in Springfield, Illinois. He became a member of the Officers Reserve Corps in 1933. He served as a Referee in Bankruptcy for the United States District Court for the Southern District  of Illinois from 1937 to 1941.

Congressional service

Howell was elected as a Republican to the 77th United States Congress and to the three succeeding Congresses and served from January 3, 1941, until his resignation on October 6, 1947.

Federal judicial service

Howell was nominated by President Harry S. Truman on July 18, 1947, to a seat on the United States Court of Claims vacated by Judge John Marvin Jones. He was confirmed by the United States Senate on July 23, 1947, and received his commission on July 30, 1947. Howell was initially appointed as a Judge under Article I, but the court was raised to Article III status by operation of law on July 28, 1953, and Howell thereafter served as an Article III Judge. His service terminated on September 30, 1953, due to his resignation.

Post judicial service and death

Following his resignation from the federal bench, Howell served as Chairman of the Illinois State Toll Highway Commission from 1953 to 1955. After this he resumed the private practice of law in Washington, D.C. until 1975. After his retirement, he resided in Largo, Florida, until his death in Clearwater, Florida on January 18, 1980, whereupon he was cremated and his remains were entombed in a niche in the Columbarium at the Arlington National Cemetery in Arlington County, Virginia.

References

Sources

1905 births
1980 deaths
Judges of the United States Court of Claims
Burials at Arlington National Cemetery
United States Article I federal judges appointed by Harry S. Truman
20th-century American judges
Republican Party members of the United States House of Representatives from Illinois
20th-century American politicians
Gies College of Business alumni
People from Marion, Illinois